Achryson peracchii is a species of longhorn beetle in the Cerambycinae subfamily. It was described by Martins in 1976. It is known from southeastern Brazil.

References

Achrysonini
Beetles described in 1976